A yahrzeit candle, also spelled yahrtzeit candle or called a memorial candle, (ner neshama, meaning "soul candle";  , meaning "anniversary candle") is a type of candle that is lit in memory of the dead in Judaism.

This kind of candle, that burns up to 26 hours, is also lit on the eve of Yom Kippur or of the Holocaust Remembrance Day ceremony (Yom HaShoah) to burn through the entire occasion. (in Judaism, days begin at sundown, in accordance with Genesis, e.g., 1:5: "And there was evening and there was morning, one day.")

History
The use of a yahrzeit candle is a widely practiced custom, where mourners light a yahrzeit candle that burns for 24 hours, on the anniversary of the death on the Hebrew calendar. The word "yahrzeit" ( yortsayt ) itself means "anniversary" (or more specifically "anniversary [of a person's death]") in Yiddish, originating from German Jahr, year, and Zeit, time. It is customary to light the candle inside one's home, or near the grave of the deceased. The candle is also lit on Yom Kippur and there are also customs to light a yahrzeit candle on the dates when yizkor is said (Yom Kippur, Shemini Atzeret, final day of Pesach, and Shavuot). It is  also customary to light the candle during the shiva, usually a larger one that lasts the entire seven days. The custom of lighting a yahrzeit candle comes from the Book of Proverbs 20:27 "The soul of man is a candle of the Lord."

The custom of lighting a yahrzeit candle for the deceased is very widespread and deeply ingrained in Jewish life.  Many Jews who are otherwise unobservant follow this custom. Today, some people use an electric yahrzeit candle that plugs into the wall instead of a candle for safety reasons, such as in a hospital.

Usage
It is lit before sundown on the eve of the yahrzeit (anniversary of the death), and by some before sundown preceding the start of Yom Kippur. Some also light before sundown preceding the eighth day of Sukkot, and the ending days of Passover and Shavuot.  These holidays all have yizkor (memorial) in synagogue as well.

Many observant Jews light longer-lasting candles made for Yahrzeit observance at the start of holidays which last for two or three days in order to allow the lighting of candles on the following days, since on holidays other than Shabbat and Yom Kippur lighting of flames is prohibited, while transfer of fire is permitted. 48 hour and 72 hour candles have also been manufactured for these purposes.

During the week of Shiva (mourning), in the absence of a seven-day Shiva candle, seven yahrzeit candles can be lit on successive days (but not in violation of Shabbat).

In culture
 After Israeli Prime Minister Yitzhak Rabin was assassinated in 1995, the young people who came to mourn Rabin at the Kings of Israel Square where he was killed were dubbed the "Youth of the Candles" (נוער הנרות, noar hanerot) after the many yahrzeit candles they lit.
Yahrzeit candles are often lit by many Jewish communities on Yom HaShoah (Holocaust Remembrance Day) in remembrance of those who were murdered in the Holocaust.

Gallery

See also
Bereavement in Judaism
Grave candle
Yahrtzeit

References

External links
 Judaica Guide: Yahrzeit Candle

Candles
Bereavement in Judaism
Observances honoring the dead